Ro-113 was an Imperial Japanese Navy Ro-100-class submarine. Completed and commissioned in October 1943, she served in World War II, operating off the Admiralty Islands, in the Indian Ocean — where she sank the last Allied ship torpedoed by a Japanese submarine during World War II — and off the Philippine Islands. She was sunk in February 1945.

Design and description
The Ro-100 class was a medium-sized, coastal submarine derived from the preceding Kaichū type. They displaced  surfaced and  submerged.

For surface running, the boats were powered by two  diesel engines, each driving one propeller shaft. When submerged each propeller was driven by a  electric motor. They could reach  on the surface and  underwater.

The boats were armed with four internal bow  torpedo tubes and carried a total of eight torpedoes. They were also armed with two single mounts for  Type 96 anti-aircraft guns or a single  L/40 AA gun.

Construction and commissioning

Ro-113 was laid down as Submarine No. 404 on 11 July 1942 by Kawasaki at Kobe, Japan. Renamed Ro-113 on 5 February 1943, she was launched on 24 April 1943. She was completed and commissioned on 12 October 1943.

Service history

October 1943–May 1944
Upon commissioning, Ro-113 was attached to the Kure Naval District and was assigned to Submarine Squadron 11 for workups. While conducting a simulated torpedo attack in the Seto Inland Sea on 9 November 1943, she collided with the battleship  in the Iyo Nada, suffering minor damage and no casualties. She proceeded to Kure for inspection and repairs.

On 31 January 1944, Ro-113 was reassigned to Submarine Division 30. She departed Kure, Japan, on 23 February 1944 for her first combat operation, an antisubmarine patrol in the Ryukyu Islands under the direction of the Grand Escort Command. She was reassigned to Submarine Division 51 in Submarine Squadron 7 in the 6th Fleet on 25 March 1944. On 21 May 1944 she departed Kure bound for Saipan in the Mariana Islands, which she reached on 29 May 1944.

First war patrol

On 8 June 1944, Ro-113 departed Saipan to begin her first war patrol, ordered to join a submarine patrol line north of New Ireland in the Bismarck Archipelago. Ordered on 22 June 1944 to return to base, she arrived at Truk on 27 June 1944.

July–August 1944

On 10 July 1944, Ro-113 departed Truk bound for Sasebo, Japan, which she reached on 17 July 1944. On 15 August 1944, Submarine Division 51 was disbanded, and Ro-113 and Ro-115 were reassigned directly to Submarine Squadron 8 in the 6th Fleet. Ro-113 departed Kure on 7 September 1944 and headed for Penang in Japanese-occupied British Malaya, arriving there on 27 September 1944 for operations in the Indian Ocean.

Second war patrol

Ro-113 got underway from Penang on 25 October 1944 to begin her second war patrol, assigned a patrol area in the Bay of Bengal.

Third war patrol

Ro-113 began her third war patrol on 28 November 1944, again tasked with attacking Allied shipping in the Bay of Bengal. A Royal Air Force Liberator bomber attacked her in the Bay of Bengal off Madras, India, on 3 December 1944, but she survived undamaged. She reported sinking a transport on 18 December 1944 and a second transport on 19 December, but postwar analysis found no evidence of her having sunk any ships on these dates. Off Penang as Ro-113 was concluding her patrol, the Royal Navy submarine  fired six torpedoes at her, all of which exploded prematurely, leading Thule′s commanding officer to claim the sinking of Ro-113, but Ro-113 survived and reached Penang safely.

Fourth war patrol

Ro-113 began her fourth war patrol on 20 January 1945, departing Penang, pausing briefly at Singapore later in the day, and then heading for her patrol area in the South China Sea west of Luzon. After calling at Takao from 7 to 9 February 1945, Ro-113 got back underway and set course for Batulinao.

Loss

Batfish lost contact at 02:41 at a range of  when Ro-113 submerged.

At 03:10, Ro-113 surfaced and Batfish′s radar detector picked up her radar emissions. Batfish also detected her on radar at a range of  bearing 336 degrees from Batfish. At 04:12, Batfish submerged to radar depth along Ro-113′s track with Ro-113  yards away and closing. At 04:48, Batfish fired three torpedoes from her stern torpedo tubes for a  run to their target. At 04:49, the first torpedo hit Ro-113, creating a large yellow fireball and blowing her apart.

On 20 February 1945, the Imperial Japanese Navy declared Ro-113 to be presumed lost in the Luzon Strait with all 59 men on board. The Japanese struck her from the Navy list on 10 May 1945.

Notes

References
 

1943 ships
Ships built by Kawasaki Heavy Industries
World War II submarines of Japan
Japanese submarines lost during World War II
Ro-100-class submarines
Maritime incidents in November 1943
Maritime incidents in February 1945
World War II shipwrecks in the Pacific Ocean
Submarines sunk by submarines
Ships sunk by American submarines
Ships lost with all hands